The International School Yangon (ISY) is a private, co-educational day school, which offers an educational program from Pre-Kindergarten through Grade 12 for students of all nationalities who desire a U.S. education. The school was founded in 1955 and is widely considered to be the most prestigious secondary school in Myanmar due to its selectivity, academic rigor, breadth of on-campus facilities, and distinguished alumni. The school year typically begins the second week of August and ends the first week of June.

The school operates as a private school entity in Myanmar (Burma) under the umbrella of the American Embassy. It is an American Embassy sponsored school and receives a small amount of its funding from The Office of Overseas Schools through the U.S. State Department.

Organisation 
The school is governed by a 9-member Board of Management elected for 2-year terms by the Parent’s Association, the sponsor of the school. Membership in the Association is automatically conferred on the parents or guardians of children enrolled in the school. The school is non-profit and non-sectarian. It is unofficially permitted to operate by the Myanmar government.

Curriculum 
The International School Yangon (ISY) has U.S.-based elementary and middle school curricula and a high school curriculum shaped by the adoption of the International Baccalaureate (IB) Program. The language of instruction is English with Mandarin, French, Spanish, and Burmese taught as additional languages. The assessment program includes Measures of Academic Progress (MAP), International School Assessment (ISA), and the Preliminary Scholastic Aptitude Test (PSAT) in addition to the broad spectrum of IB exams in grades 11 and 12. ISY is fully accredited by the Western Association of Schools and Colleges (WASC), authorised by the International Baccalaureate Organisation (IBO), and a member of the East Asia Regional Council of Schools (EARCOS). The vast majority of ISY graduates are accepted by selective universities in the United States as well as the United Kingdom.

Faculty 
In the 2015-2016 school year, there is a director, 2 principals, 2 assistant principals, an IB coordinator, 3 counselors, an advancement team, a librarian, and 68 teachers and 21 teaching assistants. Classes have 15 to 23 students.

Facilities 
The school consists of 2 campuses, one in Yangon and one in Naypyitaw. It consists of 5 buildings on a 4-acre site in the Golden Valley residential area of Yangon. It has a well-equipped library, 3 music rooms, a drama room, an elementary art room, a high school art complex, an art gallery, 4 computer labs, a science lab, a lunchroom, and a sports court. Sports facilities include a playground; a playing field; and 1 open-air, covered basketball/volleyball courts. As of the 27 of January, 2018, the school has a new large 5 storied building known as the SAS building (Science, Arts and Sports). The SAS now contains the bulk of the classes offered at ISY.

Finances 
In 2015-2016 school year, about 98 percent of the School’s income derives from school tuition and other fees. The tuition rates are: PK: $11,250; K-grade 5: $18,050; grades 6-8 $19,050; and grades 9-12 $20,250. The school charges a one-time registration fee of $1,000 for grades K-12. For the 2020-21 school year, the tuition fee for grades 9-12 was raised to $26,100.

References

 International School Yangon (ISY) School Website
 
 US Department of State, Office of Overseas Schools (ISY Factsheet 2015-2016)
 ISY High School Student Council Facebook Page

External links

International schools in Myanmar
Education in Yangon
High schools in Yangon
Educational institutions established in 1955
1955 establishments in Burma